Edith Zimmermann (born 1 November 1941) is an Austrian former alpine skier who competed in the 1964 Winter Olympics.

She was born in Lech am Arlberg.

In 1964 she won the silver medal in the downhill event. In the slalom competition she finished fifth and in the giant slalom contest she finished sixth. She is the sister of Heidi Zimmermann (born 1 May 1946), double medalist at the FIS Alpine Skiing World Championships 1966.

References 
 

1941 births
Living people
Austrian female alpine skiers
Olympic alpine skiers of Austria
Alpine skiers at the 1964 Winter Olympics
Olympic silver medalists for Austria
Olympic medalists in alpine skiing
Medalists at the 1964 Winter Olympics
20th-century Austrian women
21st-century Austrian women